The Welby Commission was a group set up by the British Government to investigate wasteful spending in India.  Established in 1895, its official name was the Royal Commission on the Administration of Expenditure of India. 

The Commission membership included:  Welby (1832-1915)  Chaman (1859-1925) and T.R. Buchanan as Parliamentary representatives, and William Wedderburn (1838-1918), Dadabhai Naoroji (1825-1917), and William S. Caine (1842-1903) as representatives of Indian interests.  G.K. Gokhale and Dinsha Wacha deposed before the commission in 1897.

The Commission's 1900 report called for the British House of Commons to insure impartiality of financial arrangements. English costs were not to be relieved at the expense of Indian revenues. India, as a member of the British Empire, was to be prepared to provide support. The India Office must be consulted regarding charges affecting India and that India's payments to England should be tied to a fixed exchange mission in Pre-independence India.

References

Commissions in Colonial India
History of India